The 2017 Women's EuroHockey Nations Championship was the 13th edition of the women's field hockey championship organised by the European Hockey Federation. It was held from 18–26 August 2017 in the Wagener Stadium, Amstelveen, Netherlands. The tournament also served as a qualifier for the 2018 Women's Hockey World Cup, with the winner qualifying.

The Netherlands won their ninth overall title by defeating Belgium 3–0 in the final, while England capture the third place by beating Germany 2–0.

Qualified teams

Format
The eight teams are split into two groups of four teams. The top two teams advance to the semifinals to determine the winner in a knockout system. The bottom two teams play in a new group with the teams they did not play against in the group stage. The last two teams will be relegated to the EuroHockey Nations Challenge.

Results
All times are local (UTC+2).

Preliminary round

Pool A

Pool B

Fifth to eighth place classification

Pool C
The points obtained in the preliminary round against the other team are taken over.

First to fourth place classification

Semifinals

Third and fourth place

Final

Final standings

Awards

Goalscorers
4 goals
 Begoña García Grau

3 goals

 Charlotte Stapenhorst
 Anna O'Flanagan
 Carlota Petchamé

2 goals

 Jill Boon
 Alex Danson
 Cécile Pieper
 Elena Tice
 Ireen van den Assem
 Margot van Geffen
 Kelly Jonker
 Marloes Keetels
 Laurien Leurink
 Caia van Maasakker
 Frédérique Matla
 Lidewij Welten
 Cristina Guinea
 Lola Riera
 Carola Salvatella

1 goal

 Alix Gerniers
 Joanne Peeters
 Anouk Raes
 Michelle Struijk
 Stephanie Van Den Borre
 Louise Versavel
 Anne-Sophie Weyns
 Barbora Haklová
 Klára Hanzlová
 Tereza Mejzlíková
 Giselle Ansley
 Sophie Bray
 Jo Hunter
 Hannah Martin
 Laura Unsworth
 Ellie Watton
 Pia Grambusch
 Franzisca Hauke
 Nike Lorenz
 Pia-Sophie Oldhafer
 Teresa Martin Pelegrina
 Yvonne O'Byrne
 Roisin Upton
 Carlien Dirkse van den Heuvel
 Kitty van Male
 Fiona Burnet
 Nikki Lloyd
 Berta Bonastre
 María López
 Marta Segu
 María Tost
 Rocío Ybarra

References

External links

  
Women's EuroHockey Nations Championship
EuroHockey Championship
EuroHockey Championship
International women's field hockey competitions hosted by the Netherlands
Sports competitions in Amsterdam
2010s in Amsterdam
EuroHockey Championship
Women 1
EuroHockey Championship